Karthaus may refer to the following:

Karthaus Township, Pennsylvania, a township in Clearfield County
Kartuzy, a town in Poland, known in German as Karthaus
Jim Karthaus, an Australian rules footballer who played with Richmond
Olaf Karthaus, a German polymer chemist 
Karthaus/Certosa, a frazione of the municipality of Schnals/Senales in South Tyrol